Senorbì is a comune (municipality) in the Province of Cagliari in the Italian region Sardinia, located about  north of Cagliari.  It is the main center of Trexenta, located in an area traditionally devoted to the cultivation of cereals. The town houses an archaeological museum (Sa Domu Nosta museum) with  findings, dating from the Ozieri culture to the Nuragic civilization, to the 14th century AD.

Senorbì borders the following municipalities: Ortacesus, San Basilio, Sant'Andrea Frius, Selegas, Siurgus Donigala, Suelli.

References

External links

 Official website

Cities and towns in Sardinia